In mathematics, the Smith–Minkowski–Siegel mass formula (or Minkowski–Siegel mass formula) is a formula for the sum of the weights of the lattices (quadratic forms) in a genus, weighted by the reciprocals of the orders of their automorphism groups. The mass formula is often given for integral quadratic forms, though it can be generalized to quadratic forms over any algebraic number field.

In 0 and 1 dimensions the mass formula is trivial, in 2 dimensions it is essentially equivalent to Dirichlet's class number formulas for imaginary quadratic fields, and in 3 dimensions some partial results were given by Gotthold Eisenstein. 

Many published versions of the mass formula have errors; in particular the 2-adic densities are difficult to get right, and it is sometimes forgotten that the trivial cases of dimensions 0 and 1 are different from the cases of dimension at least 2. 
 give an expository account and precise statement of the mass formula for integral quadratic forms, which is reliable because they check it on a large number of explicit cases.

The Smith–Minkowski–Siegel mass formula is essentially the constant term of the Weil–Siegel formula.

Statement of the mass formula
If f is an n-dimensional positive definite integral quadratic form (or lattice) then the mass
of its genus is defined to be

where the sum is over all integrally inequivalent forms in the same genus as f, and Aut(Λ) is the automorphism group of Λ. 
The form of the mass formula given by  states that for n ≥ 2 the mass is given by

where mp(f) is the p-mass of f, given by

 

for sufficiently large r, where ps is the highest power of p dividing the determinant of f. The number N(pr) is the number of n by n matrices
X with coefficients that are integers mod p r such that

where A is the Gram matrix of f, or in other words the order of the automorphism group of the form reduced mod p r.

Some authors state the mass formula in terms of the p-adic density

instead of the p-mass. The p-mass  is invariant under rescaling f but the p-density is not.

In the (trivial) cases of dimension 0 or 1 the mass formula needs some modifications. The factor of 2 in front represents the Tamagawa number of the special orthogonal group, which is only 1 in dimensions 0 and 1. Also the factor of 2 in front of mp(f) represents  the index of the special orthogonal group in the orthogonal group, which is only 1 in 0 dimensions.

Evaluation of the mass
The mass formula gives the mass as an infinite product over all primes. This can be rewritten as a finite product as follows. For all but a finite number of primes (those not dividing 2 det(ƒ)) the p-mass mp(ƒ) is equal to the standard p-mass stdp(ƒ), given by

 (for n = dim(ƒ) even)

 (for n = dim(ƒ) odd)

where the Legendre symbol in the second line is interpreted as 0 if p divides 2 det(ƒ).

If all the p-masses have their standard value, then the total mass is the
standard mass

 (For n odd)

 (For n even)

where

D = (−1)n/2 det(ƒ)

The values of the Riemann zeta function for an even integers s  are given in terms of Bernoulli numbers by

So the mass of ƒ is given as a finite product of rational numbers as

Evaluation of the p-mass

If the form f has a p-adic Jordan decomposition

where q runs through powers of p and fq has determinant prime to p and dimension n(q), 
then the p-mass is given by

Here n(II) is the sum of the dimensions of all Jordan components of type 2 and p = 2, and n(I,I) is the total number of pairs of adjacent constituents fq, f2q that are both of type I.

The factor Mp(fq) is called a diagonal factor and is a power of p times the order of a certain orthogonal group over the field with p elements.
For odd p its value is given by

when n is odd, or

when n is even and (−1)n/2dq is a quadratic residue, or

when n is even and (−1)n/2dq is a quadratic nonresidue.

For p = 2 the diagonal factor Mp(fq) is notoriously tricky to calculate. (The notation is misleading as it depends not only on fq but also on f2q and fq/2.) 
We say that fq is odd if it represents an odd 2-adic integer, and even otherwise.
The octane value of fq is an integer mod 8; if fq is even its octane value is 0 if the determinant is +1 or −1 mod 8, and is 4 if the determinant is +3 or −3 mod 8, while if fq is odd it can be diagonalized and its octane value is then the number of diagonal entries that are 1 mod 4 minus the number that are 3 mod 4.
We say that fq is  bound if at least one of f2q and fq/2 is odd, and say it is free otherwise.
The integer t is defined so that the dimension of fq  is 2t if fq is even, and 2t + 1 or 2t + 2 if fq is odd.
Then the diagonal factor Mp(fq) is given as follows.

when the form is bound or has octane value +2 or −2 mod 8 or

when the form is free and has octane value −1 or 0 or 1 mod 8 or

when the form is free and has octane value −3 or 3 or 4 mod 8.

Evaluation of ζD(s)
The required values of the Dirichlet series ζD(s) can be evaluated as follows.  We write χ for the Dirichlet character with χ(m) given by 0 if m is even, and the Jacobi symbol  if m is odd. We write k for the modulus of this character and k1 for its conductor, and put χ = χ1ψ where χ1 is the principal character mod k and ψ is a primitive character mod k1. Then

The functional equation for the L-series is

where G is the Gauss sum

If s is a positive integer then

where Bs(x) is a Bernoulli polynomial.

Examples
For the case of even unimodular lattices Λ of dimension n > 0 divisible by 8 the mass formula is

where Bk is a Bernoulli number.

Dimension n = 0
The formula above fails for n = 0, and in general the mass formula needs to be modified in the trivial cases when the dimension is at most 1. For n = 0 there is just one lattice, the zero lattice, of weight 1, so the total mass is 1.

Dimension n = 8
The mass formula gives the total mass as

There is exactly one even unimodular lattice of dimension 8, the E8 lattice, whose automorphism group is the Weyl group of E8 of order 696729600, so this verifies the mass formula in this case. 
Smith originally gave a nonconstructive proof of the existence of an even unimodular lattice of dimension 8 using the fact that the mass is non-zero.

Dimension n = 16
The mass formula gives the total mass as

There are two even unimodular lattices of dimension 16, one with root system E82
and automorphism group of order 2×6967296002 = 970864271032320000, and one with root system D16 and automorphism group of order 21516! = 685597979049984000.

So the mass formula is

Dimension n = 24
There are 24 even unimodular lattices of dimension 24, called the Niemeier lattices.

Dimension n = 32
The mass in this case is large, more than 40 million. This implies that there are more than 80 million even
unimodular lattices of dimension 32, as each has automorphism group of order at least 2 so contributes at most 1/2 to the mass. By refining this argument,  showed that there are more than a billion such lattices. In higher dimensions the mass, and hence the number of lattices, increases very rapidly.

Generalizations
Siegel gave a more general formula that  counts the weighted number of  representations of one quadratic form by forms in some genus; the Smith–Minkowski–Siegel mass formula is the special case when one form is the zero form.

Tamagawa showed that the mass formula was equivalent to the statement that the Tamagawa number of 
the orthogonal group is 2, which is equivalent to saying that the Tamagawa number of its simply connected cover the spin group is 1. André Weil conjectured more generally that the Tamagawa number of any simply connected semisimple group is 1, and this conjecture was proved by Kottwitz in 1988.

 gave a mass formula for unimodular lattices without roots (or with given root system).

See also
 Siegel identity

References

 
.

Quadratic forms
Hermann Minkowski